Denis McLaughlin (born 5 February 1987) is an Irish professional association football player who plays for Muirton AFC as a striker.

He transferred from Berwick Rangers to Hearts, and then from Hearts to Torrelavege. He has also played for Cowdenbeath, Raith Rovers and the Spanish club Gimnástica.

Career
McLaughlin started his career with Hearts, but was loaned to Berwick Rangers for the first half of the 2006–07 season in order to gain more competitive experience. He rejected the chance to extend this loan in January, instead opting to move to Raith Rovers on loan, where former coach at Hearts John McGlynn had recently been appointed manager. He joined Gimnástica on a 6-month loan deal in August 2007.

After being released by Hearts in the summer of 2009, McLaughlin signed for Second Division side Dumbarton on 30 August but moved on to Albion Rovers in February 2010. He was released at the end of the 2009-10 season and currently plays for Muirton AFC.

Honours
Dumbarton

Scottish Division Three (fourth tier): Winners 2008–09

References

External links
 
 London Hearts profile

1987 births
Living people
People from Letterkenny
Association footballers from County Donegal
Republic of Ireland association footballers
Heart of Midlothian F.C. players
Berwick Rangers F.C. players
Raith Rovers F.C. players
Dumbarton F.C. players
Scottish Junior Football Association players
Scottish Football League players
Association football forwards
Gimnástica de Torrelavega footballers
Scottish expatriate footballers
Scottish footballers
Expatriate footballers in Spain
Arthurlie F.C. players